Succotash (from Narragansett sahquttahhash, "broken corn kernels") is a vegetable dish consisting primarily of sweet corn with lima beans or other shell beans. 

Other ingredients may be added, such as onions, potatoes, turnips, tomatoes, bell peppers, corned beef, salt pork, or okra. 

Combining a grain with a legume provides a dish that is high in all essential amino acids.

History 
Succotash has a long history. An invention of the Indigenous peoples in what’s now known as New England, foreign colonists adapted the dish as a stew in the 17th century. Composed of ingredients unknown in Europe at the time, it gradually became a standard meal in the cuisine of New England and is a traditional dish of many Thanksgiving celebrations in the region, as well as in Pennsylvania and other states. 

Because of the relatively inexpensive and more readily available ingredients, the dish was popular during the Great Depression in the United States. It was sometimes cooked in a casserole form, often with a light pie crust on top as in a traditional pot pie.

Recipes 

Sweet corn (a form of maize), American beans, tomatoes, and peppers (all New World foods) are the usual ingredients.

Catherine Beecher's 19th-century recipe includes beans boiled with corn cobs from which the kernels have been removed. The kernels are added later, after the beans have boiled for several hours. The corn cobs are removed and the finished stew, in proportions of 2 parts corn to 1 part beans, is thickened with flour. 

Henry Ward Beecher's recipe, published in an 1846 issue of Western Farmer and Gardner, adds salt pork, which he says is "an essential part of the affair."

In some parts of the American South, any mixture of vegetables prepared with lima beans and topped with lard or butter is considered succotash.

In popular culture
 Sylvester the Cat's and Daffy Duck's trademark exclamations are "Sufferin' succotash!"

See also

 A Key into the Language of America
 List of legume dishes
 List of maize dishes
 List of regional dishes of the United States
 Umngqusho, a similar dish from Southern Africa

References

Further reading

External links 
 

Narragansett tribe
Native American cuisine
Legume dishes
Dishes featuring sweet corn
National dishes
Okra dishes
Cuisine of the Thirteen Colonies
Vegetarian cuisine